Los Montes is a Spanish region located in the northern part of the province of Granada, community of Andalusia, Spain. This territory limits with the Granada's counties of Baza  in the northwest, Guadix in the east and south, Vega de Granada in the south, and Loja in the west, as well as with the Jaen counties of Sierra Sur de Jaén in the northwest, Sierra Mágina in the north, and Sierra de Cazorla in the northeast.

In the eastern part of the region, the zone or sub-county of Montes Orientales is located.
The sub-county of Montes Orientales is located in the northeast part, occupying around of 1,400 km², which extends from Fardes and Guadiana Menor rivers to Frailes river. Its main mountainous system, located in the east, is Sierra Arana, a double limestone anticlinal alignment of 30 km of length, with an average altitude of 1,200 m.a.s.l (metres above sea level), being its highest level the Cerro or Peñón de la Cruz, with 2,030 m.a.s.l.

It is subdivided into the sub-county of Iznalloz (district capital), in the transition zone with the western part, and the sub-county of Pedro Martínez, more to the eastward. It predominates a landscape dominated by the hills with traditional agriculture, with herbaceous mainly, together with the mountains and dome hills with natural and repopulated vegetation, although also cultivated (mostly towards the west, where a wide range of woody crops appear).

There are also some irrigated plains (Cubillas and Guadahortuna rivers). All the population centres of the region are located above from 630 m.a.s.l and 14 of them exceed 1,000. The average altitude is 942.2 m; being Villanueva de las Torres the one which has the lowest altitude (633 m) and Torre-Cardela (1,217 m) the one which has the highest one. 
In line with its relief and proximity to the sea, it counts with a humid continental climate, which presents elements of mediterranean influence similar to areas as the Levantine, together with others more typical from the central plateau. There are long and cold winters and, at the other end, equally long and hot summers. The rainfall is scarce (less than 600 I) of unequal distribution, descending from west to east: 700 mm/year in Iznalloz, 300 mm/year in Pedro Martínez. The average annual temperature is 15 °C, oscillating between 6 and 7 °C in January and the almost 26 °C of average in July.

It contains the following municipalities:

 Alamedilla
 Alicún de Ortega
 Benalúa de las Villas
 Campotéjar
 Colomera
 Dehesas de Guadix
 Dehesas Viejas
 Deifontes
 Gobernador
 Guadahortuna
 Iznalloz
 Montejícar
 Montillana
 Morelábor
 Pedro Martínez
 Píñar
 Torre-Cardela
 Villanueva de las Torres

References 

Comarcas of the Province of Granada